This list of Vogue Thailand cover models is a catalog of cover models who have appeared on the cover of Vogue Thailand, the Thai edition of Vogue magazine, starting with the magazine's first issue in February 2013.

2013

2014

2015

2016

2017

2018

2019

2020

2021

2022

2023

External links
Vogue Thailand
Vogue Thailand at Models.com

Thailand
Vogue
Thai fashion